Kashka-Suu is a village in Jalal-Abad Region of Kyrgyzstan. It is part of the Aksy District. The village's population was 938 in 2021.

Population
Five new settlements: Tostu, Tuyuk-Jar, Ölöng-Bulak, Charbak and Kara-Bashat were established in the area of Kashka-Suu rural settlement (aýyl ökmötü) in July 2019. As a result, population of Kashka-Suu comprised 938 in 2021 as compared with 4,025 according to the 2009 Census.

References
 

Populated places in Jalal-Abad Region